The Greater Ridgeway, also known as the Great Chalk Way, is a 362-mile (583 kilometre) long-distance footpath crossing England from Lyme Regis in Dorset to Hunstanton in Norfolk. It is a combined route which is made by joining four long-distance footpaths: the Wessex Ridgeway, The Ridgeway National Trail, the Icknield Way and the Peddars Way National Trail.

External links
 The Great Chalk Way - Information about the multi-user route
 The Greater Ridgeway Trail: Information for Walkers
 The Greater Ridgeway: A walk along the ancient route from Lyme Regis to Hunstanton by Ray Quinlan

References

Footpaths in Norfolk
Roman roads in England
Ancient trackways in England
Long-distance footpaths in Dorset
Archaeological sites in Dorset
Archaeological sites in Norfolk